The second USS Chenango (CVE-28) (originally designated as T3 Tanker oiler AO-31, after re-designation as an escort carrier, was first ACV-28) was launched on 1 April 1939 as Esso New Orleans by the Sun Shipbuilding and Dry Dock Company, in Chester, Pennsylvania, sponsored by Mrs. Rathbone; acquired by the United States Navy on 31 May 1941; and commissioned on 20 June 1941 as AO-31.

Service as oiler
Assigned to the Naval Transportation Service, Chenango steamed in the Atlantic, the Caribbean, and the Pacific as far as Honolulu on tanker duty. Chenango was present at Aruba, N.W.I. on 16 February 1942 when a German submarine shelled one of the island's refineries. She was decommissioned at Brooklyn Navy Yard on 16 March for conversion to an escort carrier.

Conversion and combat service as escort carrier
Her conversion complete, she was recommissioned as ACV-28 on 19 September 1942. Carrying 77 P-40 Warhawks of the 33rd Fighter Group of the United States Army Air Forces, Chenango sailed on 23 October with the Torch assault force bound for North Africa, and on 10 November, flew off her aircraft to newly won Port Lyautey, French Morocco.  She put into Casablanca on 13 November to refuel 21 destroyers before returning to Norfolk, Virginia, on 30 November, battling through a hurricane en route which caused extensive damage.

Quickly repaired, Chenango was underway for the Pacific by mid-December, possibly alongside  as part of Task Force 13. Arriving at Nouméa on 18 January 1943, she joined the escort carrier group providing air cover for supply convoys supporting the invasion and occupation of the Solomon Islands. One of her air groups was sent to Henderson Field, Guadalcanal to give close support to U.S. Marine Corps forces ashore. One of Chenangos duties during this period was to stand sentry off the fiercely contested island. As part of her Solomons operations, Chenangos planes formed an air umbrella to escort to safety  and  after the cruisers were damaged in the Battle of Kolombangara on 13 July. Redesignated CVE-28 on 15 July, Chenango returned to Mare Island on 18 August for an overhaul, then acted as training carrier for new air groups until 19 October. She steamed from San Diego to join the Gilbert Islands invasion force at Espiritu Santo on 5 November. During the invasion of Tarawa from 20 November-8 December, her planes covered the advance of the attack force, bombed and strafed beaches ahead of the invading troops, and protected off-shore convoys. On 29 November 1943, at 21:57, her Avenger TBFs (Air Group 35) found and sank a Japanese submarine, probably I-21. She returned to San Diego for another period of training duty.

Steaming from San Diego on 13 January 1944, Chenango supported the invasion landings on Roi, Kwajalein, and Eniwetok in the Marshalls operation.  After protecting the service group refueling fleet units engaged in the Palau strikes, Chenango arrived at Espiritu Santo on 7 April. She sortied for the landings at Aitape and Hollandia (now Jayapura) (16 April–12 May), then joined Task Group 53.7 (TG 53.7) for the invasion of the Marianas. Her planes crippled airfield installations, sank enemy shipping, and hammered harbor facilities on Pagan Island, as well as conducting valuable photographic reconnaissance of Guam. From 8 July, she joined in daily poundings of Guam, preparing for the island's invasion. She returned to Manus on 13 August to replenish and conduct training.

From 10 to 29 September, Chenango joined in the neutralization of enemy airfields in the Halmaheras in support of the invasion of Morotai, stepping-stone to the Philippines.  After preparations at Manus, Chenango cleared on 12 October to conduct softening up strikes on Leyte in preparation for the invasion landings on 20 October. Chenango and her sister ship  were attacked by three Japanese planes on the afternoon of D-Day, and shot down all three, capturing one of the pilots. Sailing to Morotai to load new aircraft, Chenango was not in action waters during the Battle of Leyte Gulf, but returned on 28 October to provide replacement aircraft to her victorious sister escort carriers, who had held the Japanese fleet off from Leyte. The next day, she sailed for overhaul at Seattle, Washington until 9 February 1945.

After the overhaul period, she again sailed west, arriving at Tulagi in the Solomons on 4 March. Chenango conducted training, then sortied from Ulithi on 27 March for the invasion of Okinawa. She gave air cover in the feint landings on the southern tip of the island, then was assigned to neutralize the kamikaze bases in Sakashima Gunto. On 9 April, a crash-landing fighter started a raging fire among the strike-loaded aircraft on Chenangos deck.  Skillful work by her crew saved the ship from serious damage and she remained in action off Okinawa until 11 June. After escorting a tanker convoy to San Pedro Bay, Chenango sailed on 26 July to join the logistics force for the 3rd Fleet, then engaged in the final offensive against Japan.

Postwar service and scrapping
Following the cease-fire, Chenango supported the occupation forces and evacuated some 1,900 Allied prisoners of war and 1,500 civilians from slave labor camps. She cleared Tokyo Bay on 25 October, and after a brief overhaul at San Diego, returned to "Magic Carpet" duty, transporting veterans from Okinawa and Pearl Harbor to the West Coast. Chenango sailed from San Pedro, California on 5 February for Boston, and was placed out of commission in reserve there on 14 August 1946. She was reclassified CVHE-28 on 12 June 1955, struck from the Naval Vessel Register on 1 March 1959, sold and removed from naval custody on 12 February 1960.

Awards
Chenango was awarded the Navy Unit Commendation and received 11 battle stars for her World War II service.

Notes

References

External links
 Photo gallery at Navsource.org

Type T3-S2-A tankers
1939 ships
Merchant ships of the United States
Cimarron-class oilers (1939)
World War II auxiliary ships of the United States
World War II tankers of the United States
Sangamon-class escort carriers
Ships built by the Sun Shipbuilding & Drydock Company
World War II escort aircraft carriers of the United States